The 2003 Coppa Italia Final was the final of the 2002–03 Coppa Italia, the 56th season of the top cup competition in Italian football. The match was played over two legs on 20 May and 31 May 2003 between Roma and Milan. This was the 13th Coppa Italia final appearance by Milan and the 11th by Roma. It was the first meeting of these two clubs in the finals. Milan won the first leg 4–1, followed by a 2–2 in the second leg, giving Milan their 5th title on an aggregate score of 6–3.

First leg

Second leg

References
 rsssf.com

Coppa Italia Finals
Coppa Italia Final 2003
Coppa Italia Final 2003
Coppa Italia Final